Giacomo (or Jacopo) Zabarella  (5 September 1533 – 15 October 1589) was an Italian Aristotelian philosopher and logician.

Life
Zabarella was born into a noble Paduan family. He received a humanist education and entered the University of Padua, where he received a doctorate in 1553. His teachers included Francesco Robortello in humanities, Bernardino Tomitano in logic, Marcantonio Genua in physics and metaphysics, and Pietro Catena in mathematics. In 1564 he succeeded Tomitano in a chair of logic. In 1577 he was promoted to the first extraordinary chair of natural philosophy.  He died in Padua at the age of 56 in 1589.  His entire teaching career was spent at his native university.  His successor was Cesare Cremonini.

Work
 
Zabarella's work reflects his teaching in the Aristotelian tradition. His first published work was Opera logica (Venice 1578), followed by Tabula logicae (1578). His commentary on Aristotle's Posterior Analytics appeared in 1582. His great work in natural philosophy was De rebus naturalibus, published posthumously in 1590. It constituted 30 treatises on Aristotelian natural philosophy, the introduction to which was written only weeks before his death. His two sons edited his incomplete commentaries on Aristotle's texts, also published posthumously (the commentary on the Physics in 1601 and the commentary on On the Soul (1605).

Zabarella consulted newly recovered Greek commentators such as Alexander of Aphrodisias, Philoponus, Simplicius, and Themistius, as well as medieval commentators like Thomas Aquinas, Walter Burley, and Averroes. Unlike some earlier scholastic philosophers, he was literate in Greek, and was therefore able to use the Greek texts of Aristotle. He devoted much effort to presenting what he considered to be the true meaning of Aristotle's texts.

Writings
  1st edition (Venice, 1578). Contains:

  (Venice, 1586).
 De rebus naturalibus: libri XXX (Koln, 1590).
  3rd edition (Koln, 1597). With the addition of:

  (Venice, 1601).
 Commentarii in III libros De anima (Venice, 1605).

Editions and translations
 Opera logica, anastatic reprint of the Kōln 1597 edition by Wilhelm Risse (Hildesheim: Georg Olms, 1966).
 Tables de logique. Sur l'Introduction de Porphyre, les Catégories, le De l'interprétation et les Premiers Analytiques d'Aristote: Petite synopse introductive à la logique aristotélicienne, tr. Michel Bastit (Paris: L'Harmattan, 2003).
 La nature de la logique, tr. Dominique Bouillon (Paris: Vrin, 2009).
 On Methods and On Regressus, ed. and tr. John P. McCaskey (I Tatti Renaissance Library; Harvard University Press, 2014).
 Volume 1, On Methods, Books I–II.
 Volume 2, On Methods, Books III–IV and On Regressus.
 De rebus naturalibus libri XXX, ed. José M. García Valverde (Brill, 2016). See also:

References

Further reading
 Edwards, William F. (1960): The Logic of Iacopo Zabarella (1533–1589). Unpublished Ph.D.thesis, Columbia University.
 H. Mikkeli (1992): An Aristotelian Response to Renaissance Humanism. Jacopo Zabarella on the Nature of Arts and Sciences, Helsinki: The Finnish Historical Society.
 Randall, J.H. (1961): The School of Padua and the Emergence of Modern Science. Padova: Editrice Antenore.

External links

 
 
 Biography at The Galileo Project
 , biography of Jacopo Zabarella
 Philosophy Institute of the Düsseldorf University: Philosophengalerie, article "Jacobus Zabarella (Giacomo Zabarella)" (in German) online : with picture

 Texts of Zabarella
 German translation of De ordine intelligendi, by Rudolf Schicker
 German translation of Zabarella's De natura, by Rudolf Schicker
 Opera Logica (PDF)

1532 births
1589 deaths
Academic staff of the University of Padua
Italian philosophers
Scholastic philosophers
Aristotelian philosophers
Latin commentators on Aristotle
16th-century Italian philosophers